The Chanshal Pass, or Chanshal Valley, links Dodra Kwar and Rohru (Chirgaon) in the Shimla district of the Indian state of Himachal Pradesh. The pass remains open from May to november and is covered with snow for the rest of the year.

Location 
The Chanshal Pass is a  road from Shimla, accessible from May to november. Chanshal is a mountain range that cuts the Dodra Kawar Valley from the Rohru area. Its peaks reach  and can be accessed from Chanshal Pass.

Accessibility 
Chanshal Pass, also known as Chanshal Valley, affords good views of the scenic beauty of the Himalayas. As of June 2012, a single bus operated  between Rohru and Dodra Kwar.

Bus depart from Rohru 12:30 pm and reaches Kwar by 7 pm. Other bus starts from 8:00 AM from Kwar and reaches Rohru by 2:00PM .

Two routes connect Shimla to Chanshal Valley:

 Shimla-Theog-Kotkhai-Kharapathar-Hatkoti-Rohru-Larot-Valley, 
 Shimla-Theog-Narkanda-Tikkar-Rohru-Larot-Valley,

Geography 
The Chanshal Valley affords views of hills covered with ice. Trekking to the top of hills is fairly strenuous. Saru tal (lake) is located on the top of one of the hills resembling a Thalli.

Accommodation 
Two guest houses operate in Chansal, "The Chanshal" and "Chanshal Pass".

References 

Mountain passes of Himachal Pradesh
Geography of Shimla district